M. Monsur Ali Medical College may refer to:

 Shaheed M. Monsur Ali Medical College, Sirajganj, a public medical school in Bangladesh, established in 2014
 Shaheed Monsur Ali Medical College, a private medical college in Uttara Model Town, Uttara Dhaka